Glyptambon is an extinct genus of Silurian trilobite in the order Phacopida. It is a member of the family Dalmanitidae and the subfamily Dalmanitinae, although it has been classified in the related Ordovician subfamily Mucronaspidinae. The type species G. verrucosus was previously placed in Dalmania and later in Dalmanites. Because this species was considered distinct from other Dalmania and Dalmanites species, the new genus Glyptambon was erected for it in 1981.G. amsdeni and G. gassi were named in 1991 from Tennessee and Illinois, respectively.

References

External links
 Glyptambon at the Paleobiology Database

Dalmanitidae
Silurian trilobites
Extinct animals of the United States